Joseph Horovitz (26 May 1926 – 9 February 2022) was an Austrian-born British composer and conductor best known for his 1970 pop cantata Captain Noah and his Floating Zoo, which achieved widespread popularity in schools. Horovitz also composed music for television, including the theme music for the Thames Television series Rumpole of the Bailey, and was a prolific composer of ballet, orchestral (including nine concertos), wind band and chamber music. He considered the fifth string quartet (1969) to be his best work.

Biography
Horovitz was born in Vienna, Austria, into a Jewish family who emigrated to England in 1938 to escape the Nazis. His father was the publisher Béla Horovitz, the co-founder in 1923, with Ludwig Goldscheider, of Phaidon Press. His sister was the classical music promoter Hannah Horovitz (1936-2010).

After completing his schooling at The City of Oxford High School Horovitz studied music and modern languages at New College, Oxford, where his teachers included R. O. Morris, Percy Scholes, Bernard Rose and Egon Wellesz. He later attended the Royal College of Music in London, studying composition with Gordon Jacob. Horovitz then undertook a year of further study with Nadia Boulanger in Paris. His musical career began in 1950, when he became music director at the Bristol Old Vic. He was subsequently active as a conductor of ballet and opera, and toured Europe and the United States.

Horovitz married Anna Landau in 1956, shortly after coaching at the bi-centenary celebration for Mozart and Glyndeborne. They honeymooned in Majorca, staying in Paguera and visiting Valldemossa. He later used these two names for two clarinet pieces, based on Spanish folk-tunes he had heard there. He was Professor of Composition at the Royal College of Music from 1961, and a Council Member of the Composers' Guild of Great Britain from 1970. Between 1969 and 1996 he belonged to the board of the Performing Rights Society.

In 1959, Horovitz was awarded the Commonwealth Medal, and he received many other awards for his compositions. The city of Vienna awarded him the Gold Order of Merit in 1995. He was elected to an Honorary Fellowship of New College, Oxford in 2019. The College celebrated his 95th birthday with live-streamed performances of his 4th and 5th string quartets by the Solem Quartet, and a new string quartet commission titled Five Portraits by the composer Luke Lewis, a work which uses Horovitz's voice pitches as material for the composition.

Horowitz lived at Dawson Place, London, W2. He died on 9 February 2022, at the age of 95.

Music
His works included 16 ballets, including Alice in Wonderland (1953) written for Anton Dolin's Festival Ballet Company, the dance-drama Miss Carter Wore Pink (1980) for Northern Ballet Theatre, based on the autobiographical paintings by Helen Bradley, and two one-act operas from the 1950s (The Dumb Wife, libretto Peter Shaffer, and Gentlemen’s Island, libretto Gordon Snell). There is also a more recent three-act opera, Ninotchka (2006), based on the 1939 MGM film starring Greta Garbo.

There are nine concertos, many showing jazz influences. The first piece he acknowledged was the Concertante for clarinet and strings, Op. 1, written as a student work using Weber's Clarinet Concertino as his template. The Violin Concerto (1950) is one of his most serious works, directly influenced by his studies with Nadia Boulanger. Others include the Clarinet Concerto (1956), the Euphonium Concerto (perhaps his most overtly popular concerto in style), and the Jazz Concerto for piano, strings and percussion (1966). The latter was originally composed for George Malcolm to play on the harpsichord and combines jazz and baroque styles. Many of Horovitz's most substantial pieces were written for wind orchestra and brass band, starting with the Sinfonietta in 1968. Ad Astra for concert band was commissioned by the RAF in 1990 and drew on the composer's memory of London in The Blitz.

The first three string quartets were student works (the third accepted as the final part of his Oxford Bachelor of Music degree in 1948). The fourth, described by the composer as "dark and disturbing", was composed in 1953 following four years of work on mostly light-hearted music for ballet and opera. His fifth string quartet, which according to Daniel Snowman is "probably his most profound work", was first performed to honour the 60th birthday of Ernst Gombrich at the Victoria and Albert Museum in 1969 by the Amadeus Quartet.

The children's "pop cantata" Captain Noah and His Floating Zoo (1970) was his biggest popular success. The libretto by Michael Flanders is an adaptation of the Biblical tale of Noah found in Genesis chapters 6–9. It is one of a series of similar cantatas commissioned for school use by the publishers Novello, including The Daniel Jazz (1963) by Herbert Chappell, Jonah-Man Jazz (1966) by Michael Hurd and Joseph and the Amazing Technicolor Dreamcoat by Andrew Lloyd-Webber (1968). The piece was first recorded by the Kings Singers in 1972 on an Argo LP, and a new orchestral version by the composer was conducted by John Wilson in 2018. An environmental cantata, Summer Sunday, followed in 1975, commissioned for the Cookham Festival. His music for television included Lillie, Rumpole of the Bailey, The Search for the Nile, The Fight Against Slavery, Wessex Tales and Partners in Crime.

His more serious religious vocal works included the psalm setting Sing unto the Lord a New Song (1971), which was the first work commissioned from a Jewish composer for the choir of St Paul's Cathedral. The oratorio Samson for voices and brass band followed in 1977, a commission from the National Brass Band Championships of Great Britain.

Works

Orchestral works
1948 Concertante for Clarinet and Strings, Op. 1
1950 Violin Concerto, Op. 11
1956 Clarinet Concerto
1963 Trumpet Concerto 
1965 Jazz Concerto (Harpsichord or Piano)
1971 Sinfonietta for Light Orchestra 
1972 Horizon Overture
1973 Adagio Cantabile
1973 Valse 
1976 Bassoon Concerto 
1977 Jubilee Toy Symphony 
1993 Oboe Concerto

Works for wind orchestra and brass band
1964 Three Pieces From Music Hall Suite for brass band 
1968 Sinfonietta for brass band
1972 Euphonium Concerto for euphonium and brass band 
1975 The Dong with a Luminous Nose for brass band 
1977 Samson oratorio for baritone, mixed chorus and brass band 
1983 Ballet for Band for brass band 
1984 Bacchus on Blue Ridge: Divertimento for wind orchestra 
1985 Concertino Classico for 2 cornets (or trumpets) and brass band
1989 Tuba Concerto for tuba and brass band
1990 Ad Astra for concert band
1991 Fete Galante for wind orchestra 
1992 Dance Suite 
1994 Theme and Cooperation for brass band

Film and television scores
1963 Tarzan's Three Challenges
1971 The Search for the Nile
1973 Wessex Tales
1975 The Fight Against Slavery
1976 The Picture of Dorian Gray
1978 Lillie
1978 Rumpole of the Bailey
1983 Agatha Christie's Partners in Crime
1987 A Dorothy L. Sayers Mystery

Dramatic
1952 Les Femmes d'Alger: Ballet in one act 
1953 The Dumb Wife: Comic opera in one act 
1953 Alice in Wonderland: Ballet in two acts 
1958 Concerto for Dancers: Ballet in one act 
1958 Gentleman's Island (libretto by Gordon Snell) in English or German for tenor, baritone and chamber orchestra
1961 Horrortorio (words by Alistair Sampson from a scenario by Maurice Richardson) for soloists, chorus and orchestra. It was performed at the Hoffnung Astronautical Musical Festival 
1965 Let's Make a Ballet: Ballet in one act 
1970 Captain Noah and His Floating Zoo: Cantata (text by Michael Flanders) for mixed chorus with piano, double bass and percussion
1970 Lady Macbeth Scena for mezzo-soprano and piano
1975 Summer Sunday: a comical-tragical-ecological Pastoral for mixed choir and piano
1980 Miss Carter Wore Pink: Ballet in one act
2006 Ninotchka: a three-act opera

Chamber music
 1948 String Quartet No. 3
 1953 String Quartet No. 4
1956 Sonatina, op. 3 for oboe and piano 
 1957 Quartet for oboe and strings, Op. 18
1962 Fantasia on a Theme of Couperin for wind nonet or 11 solo strings
1964 Music Hall Suite for brass quintet
1970 Ghetto Song for solo guitar
1976 Brass Polka for brass quartet 
1969 String Quartet No. 5
1981 Sonatina For Clarinet and Piano

References

External links
 Composer Joseph Horowitz: No Ordinary Joe, BBC Radio 4 documentary, July 2011
 Composer of the Week: Gordon Jacob and Joseph Horovitz, BBC Radio 3, April 2013
Biography at the British Academy of Songwriters, Composers and Authors
Joseph Horovitz's page at Chester Novello
 
 List of émigré composers in Britain
 Theme to Rumpole of the Bailey
 Performance of the Jazz Harpsichord Concerto, RCM students

1926 births
2022 deaths
20th-century British male musicians
20th-century classical composers
20th-century English composers
20th-century Austrian Jews
21st-century Austrian Jews
Austrian classical composers
Austrian emigrants to England
English classical composers
English male classical composers
Brass band composers
Light music composers
Musicians from Vienna
Academics of the Royal College of Music
Alumni of the Royal College of Music
Alumni of New College, Oxford